Kenny Powers is the name of:

 Kenny Powers (stuntman) (1947–2009), American stuntman
 Kenny Powers (character), character in HBO series Eastbound & Down

See also 
 Powers (disambiguation)